The World RX of Norway is a Rallycross event held in Norway for the FIA World Rallycross Championship. The event made its debut in the 2014 season, at the Lånkebanen circuit near the town of Hell in Nord-Trøndelag.

Past winners

References

External links

Norway
Sports competitions in Norway